Alan M. Leventhal is an American businessman who has served as the United States ambassador to Denmark since July 2022. He is the founder, chairman and chief executive officer of Beacon Capital Partners. Leventhal served as president and chief executive officer of Beacon Properties Corporation, one of the largest real estate investment trusts (REIT) in the United States.

Education
Leventhal was one of three children born to a Jewish family, the son of Muriel (née Guren) and Norman Leventhal. He received his bachelor's degree in economics from Northwestern University in 1974 and a Master of Business Administration from the Tuck School of Business at Dartmouth College in 1976. Leventhal was chairman of Boston University's board of trustees from 2003 to 2008, a trustee of Northwestern University and an overseer of the Tuck School of Business.  He has served on the board of the Pension Real Estate Association (PREA), the board of the Damon Runyon Cancer Research Foundation, and the board of Friends of Post Office Square.

Career
Leventhal has lectured at the Tuck School of Business and the Massachusetts Institute of Technology (MIT) Center for Real Estate. Leventhal was awarded an honorary Doctor of Laws from Boston University on May 17, 2009.

Ambassador to Denmark
On January 19, 2022, President Joe Biden nominated Leventhal to become the United States Ambassador to Denmark. Hearings on his nomination were held before the Senate Foreign Relations Committee on May 4, 2022. The committee favorably reported his nomination to the Senate floor on May 18, 2022.

On June 15, 2022, the full United States Senate voted to confirm Leventhal to be ambassador in a 63–32 vote. He presented his credentials to Queen Margrethe II on July 1, 2022. His first official engagement was to speak at the 4th of July celebration in Rebild, 2022.

Philanthropy and awards
Leventhal and his wife, Sherry, are philanthropists, who operate the Sherry and Alan Leventhal Family Foundation. They made a $5 million donation to Boston University. Moreover, his family has given $10 million to the Boston Public Library for the creation of the Norman B. Leventhal Map Center.

Leventhal was awarded the Realty Stock Review's "Outstanding CEO Award" for 1996 and 1997, and the Commercial Property News "Office Property Executive of the Year" for 1996.  In 2004 he received Ernst & Young's New England Entrepreneur of the year award.

Personal life
Leventhal has been married twice. His first wife was Carol (née Gant) Leventhal; they had three sons, Jeremy Nathaniel Leventhal, Alexander Leventhal, and Evan Levanthal. Leventhal is married to Sherry Marcus, the daughter of Dr. Irwin Marcus; they have two daughters and four sons in total.

References

External links 
Beacon Capital Partners (company website)

Living people
21st-century American diplomats
21st-century American Jews
Ambassadors of the United States to Denmark
American philanthropists
American real estate businesspeople
Jewish American philanthropists
Northwestern University alumni
Tuck School of Business alumni
Year of birth missing (living people)